Britain entered World War I on 4 August 1914 when the King declared war after the expiration of an ultimatum to the German Empire. The official explanation focused on protecting Belgium as a neutral country; the main reason, however, was to prevent a French defeat that would have left Germany in control of Western Europe. The Liberal Party was in power with prime minister H. H. Asquith and foreign minister Edward Grey leading the way. The Liberal cabinet made the decision, although the party had been strongly anti-war until the last minute. The Conservative Party was pro-war. The Liberals knew that if they split on the war issue, they would lose control of the government to the Conservatives.

Background

For much of the 19th century, Britain pursued a foreign policy later known as splendid isolation, which sought to maintain the balance of power in Europe without formal alliances. As Europe divided into two power blocs during the 1890s, the 1895-1905 Conservative government realised this left Britain dangerously exposed. This resulted in the 1902 Anglo-Japanese Alliance, followed by King Edward VII's 1903 visit to Paris. By reducing anti-British feeling in France, it led to the 1904 Entente Cordiale, the first tangible impact of which was British support for France against Germany in the 1905 Moroccan Crisis.

In 1907, the new Liberal government agreed to the Anglo-Russian Convention. Like the Entente, the Convention focused on resolving colonial disputes; but by doing so, it paved the way for wider co-operation and allowed Britain to refocus its naval resources in response to German naval expansion.

The 1911 Agadir Crisis encouraged secret military negotiations between France and Britain in the case of war with the German Empire. A British Expeditionary Force of 100,000 men would be landed in France within two weeks of war, while naval arrangements allocated responsibility for the Mediterranean Sea to the French Navy, with the Royal Navy looking after the North Sea and the English Channel, including Northern France. Britain was effectively bound to support France in a war against Germany regardless, but this was not widely understood outside government and the military.

Antagonism with Germany
In explaining why Britain went to war with Germany, British historian Paul Kennedy (1980) argued that a critical factor was the British realisation that Germany was rapidly becoming economically more powerful than Britain. It was in essence not a consequence of the disputes over economic trade imperialism, the Baghdad Railway, the confrontations in Eastern Europe, highly-charged political rhetoric, or domestic pressure groups. Germany's reliance time and again on military aggression, while Britain increasingly appealed to moral sensibilities, also played a role, especially in portraying the invasion of neutral Belgium as (in the German view) a necessary military tactic or (in the British view) a profound moral crime. The German invasion of Belgium was not the real cause of war with Britain, because the British decision had already been made as the British were more concerned with the fate of France (pp. 457–62). Kennedy argues that by far the main reason was London's fear that a repeat of the war of 1870, when Prussia and the German states smashed France, would mean that a rapidly industrialising Germany, with a powerful army and navy, would control the English Channel and northwest France. British policy-makers insisted that that would be a catastrophe for British security.

Christopher Clark points out that the British cabinet decided on July 29, 1914, that being a signatory to the 1839 treaty guaranteeing Belgium's frontiers did not obligate it to oppose a German invasion of Belgium with military force.

Decision for war
In the immediate aftermath of the assassination on June 28 of Austrian Archduke Franz Ferdinand (the heir to the Habsburg throne) in the Bosnian capital, Sarajevo, the British newspapers denounced the Serbian nationalist assassin, Gavrilo Princip, and were generally sympathetic to the Austro-Hungarian monarchy. The newspapers blamed the Kingdom of Serbia for the crime, with rhetoric against "fanatics", "dangerous forces" and "reckless agitators". These responses were broadly shared across the political spectrum, with Liberal and Conservative papers expressing their shock and dismay. But by July 27, press opinion had turned against Austria-Hungary. The national press divided along party lines, with Conservative papers stressing the obligation to support France, while Liberal papers insisted Britain had no such commitment and should remain neutral. 

As Germany and Russia became the central players in the crisis (respectively backing Austria-Hungary and Serbia), British leaders increasingly had a sense of commitment to defending France. First, if Germany again conquered France, as had happened in the Franco-Prussian War of 1870, it would become a major threat to British economic, political and cultural interests. Second, partisanship was involved. The Liberal Party was identified with internationalism and free trade, and with opposition to jingoism and warfare. By contrast, the Conservative Party was identified as the party of nationalism and patriotism; Britons expected it "to show capacity in running a war." Liberal voters initially demanded peace, but were outraged when the Germans treated Belgian neutrality as a worthless "scrap of paper" (the words of German Chancellor Theobald von Bethmann Hollweg in ridiculing the Treaty of London). Germany, as part of a massive attack on France, invaded northern France through Belgium early on the morning of 4 August. The Belgians called upon Britain for military assistance under the 1839 treaty, and in response London gave Berlin an ultimatum which expired at 11 pm London time, which was ignored. King George V then declared war on Germany that evening.

Before war was declared, the British newspapers gave the crisis extensive coverage but varied wildly in recommended policy options, basically covering the entire spectrum from peace to war. C. P. Scott and the Manchester Guardian maintained an intense campaign against war. It denounced a "conspiracy to drag us into a war against England’s interests", arguing that it would amount to a "crime against Europe", and warning that it would "throw away the accumulated progress of half a century". The politician David Lloyd George told Scott on Tuesday 4th August 1914, "Up until last Sunday only two members of the Cabinet had been in favour of our intervention in the war, but the violation of Belgian territory had completely altered the situation". According to Isabel V. Hull:
Annika Mombauer correctly sums up the current historiography: "Few historians would still maintain that the 'rape of Belgium' was the real motive for Britain's declaration of war on Germany." Instead, the role of Belgian neutrality is variously interpreted as an excuse used to mobilise public opinion, to provide embarrassed radicals in the cabinet with the justification for abandoning the principal of pacifism and thus staying in office, or - in the more conspiratorial versions - as cover for naked imperial interests. 

Once war was declared, defence of Belgium rather than France was the public reason given for the war. Propaganda posters emphasised that Britain was required to safeguard Belgium's neutrality under the 1839 Treaty of London.

As late as 1 August 1914, the great majority of Liberals—both voters and cabinet members—strongly opposed going to war. The German invasion of Belgium was such an outrageous violation of international rights that the Liberal Party agreed for war on August 4th. Historian Zara Steiner says: 
The public mood did change. Belgium proved to be a catalyst which unleashed the many emotions, rationalizations, and glorifications of war which had long been part of the British climate of opinion. Having a moral cause, all the latent anti-German feelings, fueled by years of naval rivalry and assumed enmity, rose to the surface. The 'scrap of paper' proved decisive both in maintaining the unity of the government and then in providing a focal point for public feeling.

The Liberals succeeded in mending their deep divisions over military action. Unless the Liberal government acted decisively against the German invasion of France, its top leaders including Prime Minister H. H. Asquith, Foreign Minister Edward Grey, First Lord of the Admiralty Winston Churchill and others would resign, leading to a risk that the much more pro-war Conservative Party might form a government. Mistreatment of Belgium was not itself a fundamental cause of British entry into the war, but it was used extensively as a justification in wartime propaganda to motivate the British people.
 
The German high command was aware that entering Belgium could trigger British intervention but decided the risk was acceptable; they expected it to be a short war, and their ambassador in London claimed civil war in Ireland would prevent Britain from assisting France.

Historians looking at the July Crisis typically conclude that Grey:
was not a great Foreign Secretary but an honest, reticent, punctilious English gentleman... He exhibited a judicious understanding of European affairs, a firm control of his staff, and a suppleness and tact in diplomacy, but he had no boldness, no imagination, no ability to command men and events. [Regarding the war] He pursued a cautious, moderate policy, one that not only fitted his temperament, but also reflected the deep split in the Cabinet, in the Liberal party, and in public opinion.
The majority of the Labour Party, which as a member of the Second International had opposed the war, also shifted to support after the German invasion of Belgium with the exception of some members such as its secretary Ramsay MacDonald. The rest of the Labour Party leadership under Arthur Henderson calculated that the war would be brief and that opposing it would cost the party at the next general election.

Irish crisis on hold

Until late July, British politics was totally focused on the threat of a possible civil war in Ireland. In 1912 the government had presented an Irish Home Rule bill that Irish nationalists demanded; under the terms of the Parliament Act 1911, by which the House of Lords retained the right to delay legislation by up to two years, it was due to become law in 1914. The Ulster Protestants demanded separate treatment; by mid-1914 the government was offering a six-year opt-out to the six counties which would eventually become Northern Ireland, but not the permanent exemption which they demanded. Both sides in Ireland had smuggled in weapons, set up militias with tens of thousands of volunteers, were drilling, and were ready to fight a civil war. The British Army itself was paralyzed: during the Curragh Incident officers threatened to resign or accept dismissal rather than obey orders to deploy into Ulster. Elements of the Conservative and Unionist Party supported them.

On 25 July the Austrian ultimatum to Serbia became known, and the cabinet realized that war with Germany was increasingly likely. The Government of Ireland Act 1914 was enacted into law, but was suspended for the duration of hostilities, with the issue of Ulster still unresolved.  Grey told the British Parliament on 3 August, "The one bright spot in the whole of this terrible situation is Ireland. [Prolonged cheers.] The general feeling throughout Ireland, and I would like this to be clearly understood abroad, does not make that a consideration that we feel we have to take into account. [Cheers.]"

Empire at war

The king's declaration of war automatically involved all dominions, colonies, and protectorates of the British Empire, many of whom made significant contributions to the Allied war effort, both in the provision of troops and civilian labourers.

See also

 Causes of World War I
 Austro-Hungarian entry into World War I
 French entry into World War I
 German entry into World War I
 Ottoman entry into World War I
 Russian entry into World War I
 Allies of World War I
 Triple Entente
 France–United Kingdom relations
 Germany–United Kingdom relations
 British military history
 History of the United Kingdom, since 1707
 International relations of the Great Powers (1814–1919)
 Diplomatic history of World War I
 Color book
 International relations (1919–1939)
 Timeline of British diplomatic history
 History of the foreign relations of the United Kingdom

Notes

Further reading

 Albertini, Luigi. The Origins of the War of 1914 (3 vol 1952).
 Anderson, Frank Maloy, and Amos Shartle Hershey, eds. Handbook For The Diplomatic History Of Europe, Asia, and Africa, 1870-1914 (1918) online
 Bartlett, Christopher John. Defence and diplomacy: Britain and the Great Powers, 1815-1914 (Manchester UP, 1993).
 Bartlett, C. J. British Foreign Policy in the Twentieth Century (1989).
 Brandenburg, Erich. (1927) From Bismarck to the World War: A History of German Foreign Policy 1870–1914 (1927) online.
 Bridge, F. R. “The British Declaration of War on Austria-Hungary in 1914.” Slavonic and East European Review 47#109 (1969), pp. 401–422. online
 Charmley, John. Splendid Isolation?: Britain, the Balance of Power and the Origins of the First World War (1999), highly critical of Grey.
 Clark, Christopher. The Sleepwalkers: How Europe Went to War in 1914 (2013) excerpt
 Sleepwalkers lecture by Clark. online
 Ensor, R. C. K.  England, 1870–1914 (1936) online
  essays by scholars from both sides
 Fay, Sidney B. The Origins of the World War (2 vols in one. 2nd ed. 1930). online, passim
 French, David. British Economic and Strategic Planning 1905-15 (1982).
 Goodlad, Graham D. British Foreign and Imperial Policy 1865–1919 (1999).
 Hale, Oron James. Publicity and Diplomacy: With Special Reference to England and Germany, 1890-1914 (1940) online
 Hamilton, Richard F. and Holger H. Herwig, eds. War Planning 1914 (2014) pp 48–79
 Hamilton, Richard F. and Holger H. Herwig, eds. The Origins of World War I (2003) pp 266–299.
 Hamilton, Richard F.. and Holger H. Herwig. Decisions for War, 1914-1917 (2004).
 Hinsley, F. H. ed. British Foreign Policy under Sir Edward Grey (1977) 31 major scholarly essays
 Howard, Christopher. "MacDonald, Henderson, and the Outbreak of War, 1914." Historical Journal 20.4 (1977): 871-891. online
 
 Kennedy, Paul. The Rise and Fall of the Great Powers (1987), pp 194–260. online free to borrow
 Kennedy, Paul. The Rise and Fall of British Naval mastery (1976) pp 205–38.
 Kennedy, Paul M. "Idealists and realists: British views of Germany, 1864–1939." Transactions of the Royal Historical Society 25 (1975): 137-156.  online
 McMeekin, Sean. July 1914: Countdown to War (2014) scholarly account, day-by-day
 ; major scholarly overview
 Massie, Robert K. Dreadnought: Britain, Germany, and the coming of the Great War (Random House, 1991) excerpt see Dreadnought (book), popular history

 Matzke, Rebecca Berens. . Deterrence through Strength: British Naval Power and Foreign Policy under Pax Britannica (2011) online
 Mowat, R. B. "Great Britain and Germany in the Early Twentieth Century" English Historical Review (1931) 46#183 pp. 423–441 online
 Murray, Michelle. "Identity, insecurity, and great power politics: the tragedy of German naval ambition before the First World War." Security Studies 19.4 (2010): 656-688. online
 Neilson,  Keith. Britain and the Last Tsar: British Policy and Russia, 1894-1917 (1995) online
 Otte, T. G. July Crisis: The World's Descent into War, Summer 1914 (Cambridge UP, 2014). online review
 Paddock, Troy R. E. A Call to Arms: Propaganda, Public Opinion, and Newspapers in the Great War  (2004) online
 Padfield, Peter. The Great Naval Race: Anglo-German Naval Rivalry 1900-1914 (2005)
 Papayoanou, Paul A. "Interdependence, institutions, and the balance of power: Britain, Germany, and World War I." International Security 20.4 (1996): 42-76.
 Rich, Norman. Great Power Diplomacy: 1814-1914 (1991), comprehensive survey
 Ritter, Gerhard. The Sword and the Sceptre, Vol. 2-The European Powers and the Wilhelmenian Empire 1890-1914  (1970) Covers military policy in Germany and also France, Britain, Russia and Austria.
 Schmitt, Bernadotte E. "Triple Alliance and Triple Entente, 1902-1914." American Historical Review 29.3 (1924): 449-473. in JSTOR
 Schmitt, Bernadotte Everly.  England and Germany, 1740-1914 (1916). online
 Scott, Jonathan French. Five Weeks: The Surge of Public Opinion on the Eve of the Great War (1927)   pp 99–153 online.
 Seligmann, Matthew S. "A Service Ready for Total War? The State of the Royal Navy in July 1914." English Historical Review 133.560 (2018): 98-122 online.

  Seton-Watson, R. W. Britain in Europe, 1789–1914, a survey of foreign policy (1937) useful overview online
 Steiner, Zara S. Britain and the origins of the First World War (1977), a major scholarly survey. online
 Stowell, Ellery Cory. The Diplomacy of the War of 1914 (1915)  728 pages online free
 
 Tucker, Spencer C., ed. The European Powers in the First World War: An Encyclopedia  (1996) 816pp.
 Vyvyan, J. M. K. "The Approach of the War of 1914." in C. L. Mowat, ed. The New Cambridge Modern History: Vol. XII: The Shifting Balance of World Forces 1898-1945 (2nd ed. 1968) online pp 140–70.
 Ward A.W., ed. The Cambridge History Of British Foreign Policy 1783-1919 Vol III  1866-1919 (1923) v3 online
 Williamson Jr., Samuel R. "German Perceptions of the Triple Entente after 1911: Their Mounting Apprehensions Reconsidered" Foreign Policy Analysis 7.2 (2011): 205-214.
 Williamson, Samuel R. The politics of grand strategy: Britain and France prepare for war, 1904-1914 (1990).
 Wilson, Keith M. "The British Cabinet's decision for war, 2 August 1914." Review of International Studies 1.2 (1975): 148-159.
 Wood, Harry. "Sharpening the Mind: The German Menace and Edwardian National Identity." Edwardian Culture (2017). 115-132. public fears of German invasion.
 Woodward, E.L. Great Britain And The German Navy (1935) 535pp; scholarly history online
 Young, John W. "Ambassador George Buchanan and the July Crisis." International History Review 40.1 (2018): 206-224. online
 Young, John W. "Emotions and the British Government’s Decision for War in 1914." Diplomacy & Statecraft 29.4 (2018): 543-564. online
  "British Entry into World War I: Did the Germans Have Reason to Doubt that the British Would Declare War in 1914?" in   Paul du Quenoy ed., History in Dispute Vol. 16: Twentieth-Century European Social and Political Movements: First Series (St. James Press 2000; Gale E-Books) 10pp summary of debate

Historiography
 Cornelissen, Christoph, and Arndt Weinrich, eds. Writing the Great War - The Historiography of World War I from 1918 to the Present (2020) free download; full coverage for major countries.
 Herwig,  Holger H. ed., The Outbreak of World War I: Causes and Responsibilities (1990) excerpts from primary and secondary sources
 Horne, John, ed. A Companion to World War I (2012) 38 topics essays by scholars
 Kramer, Alan. "Recent Historiography of the First World War – Part I", Journal of Modern European History (Feb. 2014) 12#1 pp 5–27; "Recent Historiography of the First World War (Part II)", (May 2014) 12#2 pp 155–174.
 Langdon, John W. "Emerging from Fischer's shadow: recent examinations of the crisis of July 1914." History Teacher 20.1 (1986): 63-86, historiography in JSTOR
 Mombauer, Annika. "Guilt or Responsibility? The Hundred-Year Debate on the Origins of World War I." Central European History 48.4 (2015): 541-564.
 Mulligan, William. "The Trial Continues: New Directions in the Study of the Origins of the First World War." English Historical Review (2014) 129#538 pp: 639–666.
 Winter, Jay. and Antoine Prost eds.  The Great War in History: Debates and Controversies, 1914 to the Present (2005)

Primary sources
 Barker. Ernest, et al. eds. Why we are at war; Great Britain's case (3rd ed. 1914), the official British case against Germany. online
 Gooch, G.P. Recent revelations of European diplomacy (1928) pp 3-101. online
 Major 1914 documents from BYU
 Gooch, G.P. and Harold Temperley, eds. British documents on the origins of the war, 1898-1914 (11 vol.) online
v. i The end of British isolation -- v.2. The Anglo-Japanese Alliance and the Franco-British Entente -- v.3. The testing of the Entente, 1904-6 -- v.4. The Anglo-Russian rapprochment, 1903-7 -- v.5. The Near East, 1903-9 -- v.6. Anglo-German tension. Armaments and negotiation, 1907-12 -- v.7. The Agadir crisis -- v.8. Arbitration, neutrality and security -- v.9. The Balkan wars, pt.1-2 -- v.10, pt.1. The Near and Middle East on the eve of war. pt.2. The last years of peace -- v.11. The outbreak of war V.3. The testing of the Entente, 1904-6 -- v.4. The Anglo-Russian rapprochment, 1903-7 -- v.5. The Near East, 1903-9 -- v.6. Anglo-German tension. Armaments and negotiation, 1907-12 -- v.7. The Agadir crisis -- v.8. Arbitration, neutrality and security -- v.9. The Balkan wars, pt.1-2 -- v.10, pt.1. The Near and Middle East on the eve of war. pt.2. The last years of peace --   v.11. The outbreak of war. 
 Joll, James, ed. Britain and Europe 1793-1940 (1967); 390pp of documents; online
 Jones, Edgar Rees, ed. Selected speeches on British foreign policy, 1738-1914 (1914). online free
 Lowe, C.J. and Michael L. Dockrill, eds. Mirage of Power: The Documents v. 3: British Foreign Policy (1972); vol 3 = primary sources 1902-1922
 Scott, James Brown, ed., Diplomatic Documents Relating To The Outbreak Of The European War (1916)  online
  United States. War Dept. General Staff. Strength and organization of the armies of France, Germany, Austria, Russia, England, Italy, Mexico and Japan (showing conditions in July, 1914) (1916) online
 Wilson, K.M. "The British Cabinet's Decision for War, 2 August 1914" British Journal of International Studies 1#3 (1975), pp. 148–159 online
 Young, John W. "Lewis Harcourt's Journal of the 1914 War Crisis." International History Review 40.2 (2018): 436-455. Diary of UK cabinet discussions  26 July to Aug. 4, 1914.

1914 in the United Kingdom
1914 in military history
August 1914 events
Historiography of the British Empire
History of the foreign relations of the United Kingdom
Britain
Military history of the United Kingdom during World War I
George V
H. H. Asquith